Ensis minor, or the jackknife clam, is a long, smooth-shelled, burrowing clam found in the Atlantic Ocean. These clams are often collected for food. It is white, sometimes with reddish-brown markings.

References

Pharidae
Commercial molluscs